Mike Setefano is a former Samoa international rugby league footballer who played at the 1995 Rugby League World Cup.

Playing career
Setefano played for the Auckland City Vulcans in the 1994 Lion Red Cup, and toured New Zealand with Western Samoa in 1994. In 1995 he joined the North Harbour Sea Eagles, and was part of the team that won the 1995 Lion Red Cup. He was part of the Western Samoa 1992 Pacific Cup, and 1996 Pacific Challenge sides.

References

External links
World Cup 1995 details

Living people
Auckland rugby league team players
New Zealand rugby league players
New Zealand sportspeople of Samoan descent
Samoa national rugby league team players
North Harbour rugby league team players
Richmond Bulldogs players
Marist Saints players
Junior Kiwis players
Rugby league props
Year of birth missing (living people)